Matthew Adams (born 26 September 1988) is an Australian professional wrestler currently signed to All Elite Wrestling (AEW) under the ring name Buddy Matthews as a member of the stable House of Black and is one-third of the current AEW World Trios Champion with Malakai Black and Brody King in their first reign. He is best known for his time with WWE where he performed under the ring names Buddy Murphy and Murphy. 

Prior to joining WWE, Adams wrestled primarily in his native Australia under the ring name Matt Silva, appearing with promotions such as Professional Championship Wrestling (PCW) and Melbourne City Wrestling (MCW). In 2013, he relocated to the United States to work for WWE, starting out in its developmental territory NXT. During his time in NXT, he formed a tag team with Wesley Blake that won the NXT Tag Team Championship on one occasion, making him the first Australian national to win a championship in WWE. In 2018, Adams was moved to WWE's main roster, appearing on 205 Live; he won the WWE Cruiserweight Championship later that year. He was moved to SmackDown in April 2019 and then to Raw in October 2019, where he aligned himself with Seth Rollins, leading to the duo winning the WWE Raw Tag Team Championship. Murphy left WWE in June 2021, subsequently wrestling for New Japan Pro-Wrestling and Major League Wrestling as "Buddy Matthews". Adams made his debut for All Elite Wrestling on the 23 February 2022 episode of AEW Dynamite.

Early life 
Matthew Adams was born on 26 September 1988 in Melbourne, Victoria, Australia. He attended Berwick Secondary College, where he graduated in 2005.

Professional wrestling career

Early career (2007–2013) 
Adams was trained by Carlo Cannon. He made his debut on 8 September 2007 as "Matt Silva", at Professional Championship Wrestling (PCW), where he teamed with Jacko Lantern to defeat Adam Brooks and Diaz. He won the PCW State Championship by defeating Danny Psycho on 3 December 2010. He was also a mainstay in Melbourne City Wrestling (MCW), where he won the MCW Heavyweight Championship by defeating Slex on 28 January 2012. He held the championship for 293 days.

WWE (2013–2021)

Blake and Murphy (2013–2017) 
 

On 17 March 2013, Adams signed a developmental contract with WWE and was assigned to their developmental territory NXT. On 23 November, he debuted as Buddy Murphy at an NXT house show, teaming with Sawyer Fulton and Troy McClain against Angelo Dawkins, Colin Cassady, and Wesley Blake. On 15 May 2014 episode of NXT, he teamed with Elias Samson in a losing effort against The Ascension.

In August 2014, Murphy formed a tag team with Wesley Blake. On 14 August episode of NXT, they were defeated in the first round of a number one contender tag team tournament by The Lucha Dragons (Kalisto and Sin Cara). For the rest of 2014, they lost multiple matches to The Lucha Dragons and The Vaudevillains (Aiden English and Simon Gotch). Also in October 2014, they lost a number one contender tag team battle royal, being eliminated by The Ascension.

On 21 January 2015 episode of NXT, Blake and Murphy defeated The Vaudevillains and quickly challenged The Lucha Dragons to a title match. On 28 January episode of NXT, Blake and Murphy defeated the champions to win the NXT Tag Team Championship, making Murphy the first Australian to hold a championship in WWE. At NXT TakeOver: Rival, Blake and Murphy, now billed simply by their surnames, defeated the Lucha Dragons in a rematch for the title. Following that in March, Blake and Murphy began a feud with Enzo Amore and Colin Cassady, who were intent on capturing the tag titles. Blake and Murphy attempted to woo Carmella on several occasions. On 13 May episode of NXT, Blake and Murphy distracted Carmella during her match with Alexa Bliss, causing her to lose. At NXT TakeOver: Unstoppable, during Amore and Cassady's NXT Tag Team Championship match against Blake and Murphy, Alexa Bliss came out mid-match and attacked Carmella and Amore, ensuring the win for Blake and Murphy. After making several successful title defences, Blake and Murphy lost the championships to the Vaudevillians at NXT TakeOver: Brooklyn, ending their reign at 219 days.

On 18 May 2016 episode of NXT, after losing to Austin Aries and Shinsuke Nakamura, Bliss and then Blake walked away from Murphy, teasing a split for the team. On 1 June episode of NXT, his ring name was reverted to Buddy Murphy, where he was defeated by Tye Dillinger. On 15 June episode of NXT, Blake and Murphy reunited, but after a miscommunication between the two, they were defeated by TM-61 (Nick Miller and Shane Thorne). The following week, Murphy announced himself as a singles competitor by interrupting Shinsuke Nakamura, leading to a match with Nakamura, which Murphy lost. On 4 January 2017 episode of NXT, Murphy teamed with Tye Dillinger to defeat Bobby Roode and Elias Samson, and this turned out to be Murphy's last televised appearance in NXT, before being called up to main roster.

Cruiserweight Champion (2018–2019) 

In early 2018, Murphy lost about 25 pounds and asked to compete on the 205 Live brand. On 20 February episode of 205 Live, he made his debut as a participant in the Cruiserweight Championship tournament, defeating Ariya Daivari in the first round but lost to Mustafa Ali in the quarterfinals. On 27 March episode of 205 Live, Murphy defeated TJP, Akira Tozawa, Kalisto in a fatal four-way match for a future shot at the Cruiserweight Championship. On 10 April episode of 205 Live, Murphy attacked new WWE Cruiserweight Champion Cedric Alexander from behind, starting a feud between the two. However, Murphy failed his mandatory weigh-in and was removed from the match and the 205 Live roster until he met the weight requirement. On 8 May episode of 205 Live, Murphy defeated Ali in a rematch from their Cruiserweight Championship  tournament quarterfinal match.

He started a storyline where he had to lose weight, challenging Alexander for the title on 29 May episode of 205 Live, where he failed to win the title. The following week, he had a match with Mustafa Ali that ended in a no-contest after both men were attacked by Hideo Itami, who won a triple threat match against both men the following week. On 3 July episode of 205 Live, he lost to Ali in a No Disqualification match. He then went on to form a tag team with Tony Nese and they subsequently feuded with Lucha House Party (Gran Metalik, Lince Dorado and Kalisto). On 6 October at Super Show-Down in his hometown of Melbourne, Murphy defeated Alexander to win the Cruiserweight Championship, his first singles title in WWE, the first Australian man to accomplish this feat.

Murphy subsequently retained the title against Mustafa Ali at Survivor Series and Alexander at TLC, respectively. On 27 January 2019, Murphy successfully defended his title in a fatal four-way match against Akira Tozawa, Kalisto and Hideo Itami at the Royal Rumble Kickoff Show after pinning Itami. On 17 February, Murphy retained his title against Tozawa at Elimination Chamber. At the WrestleMania 35 Kickoff Show, he lost his title to former partner Tony Nese, ending his reign at 183 days. Prior to this loss, Murphy had been undefeated in televised singles matches dating back to July 2018. On 9 April episode of 205 Live, Murphy was again defeated by Nese in a rematch for the WWE Cruiserweight Championship.

Brand switches (2019–2020) 
On 16 April, Murphy was drafted to the SmackDown brand as part of the Superstar Shake-up. He participated in the 51-Man Battle Royal at Super ShowDown, but was unsuccessful. On 30 July episode of SmackDown, a stack of scaffolding fell onto Roman Reigns backstage. Murphy was shown in the background of the event. The following week, Reigns confronted Murphy about his involvement in the event. After being physically intimidated by Reigns, Murphy revealed that Rowan was Reigns' mystery attacker. At SummerSlam, Murphy defeated Apollo Crews by disqualification, after Rowan attacked him mid-match. On 19 August, Murphy was announced as one of sixteen competitors in the King of the Ring tournament. Murphy faced Mustafa Ali in the first round on 27 August episode of SmackDown Live, where he was eliminated.

On 14 October, Murphy was drafted to the Raw brand as part of the 2019 draft. Over the following weeks, Murphy developed a winning streak, defeating the likes of R-Truth, Cedric Alexander, Akira Tozawa, Matt Hardy, and Zack Ryder. He entered in a 20-man battle royal at Crown Jewel on 31 October to determine who would face AJ Styles for the United States Championship later in the night, but he failed to win. Murphy engaged in a feud with Aleister Black towards the end of 2019. However, he lost to Black at TLC: Tables, Ladders & Chairs, the 30 December episode of Raw and the 13 January 2020 episode of Raw.

Storyline with Seth Rollins (2020–2021) 
On 13 January episode of Raw, after losing to Aleister Black three times in a row, Murphy sat at ring side in distress throughout the remainder of the show. During the main event, Murphy aligned with "Monday Night Messiah" Seth Rollins and AOP, allowing them to defeat Big Show, Samoa Joe and Kevin Owens and joining in their stable as a disciple. The following week on Raw, Murphy and Rollins defeated The Viking Raiders (Erik and Ivar) to win the WWE Raw Tag Team Championship. On 7 February, his ring name was shortened back to simply Murphy after he requested when WWE producer Michael Hayes told him the name Buddy sounds too friendly. Murphy and Rollins successfully defended their titles against The Street Profits at Super ShowDown on 27 February, but eventually lost the titles to them in a rematch on 2 March episode of Raw. Their reign ended at 42 days. Murphy and Rollins failed to reclaim the championship from the team at Elimination Chamber six days later. On 20 April episode of Raw, Murphy lost to Rey Mysterio in a Money in the Bank ladder match qualifier.

In May, Murphy and Rollins started a feud with Rey Mysterio and his family, as well as Aleister Black. At Payback, Murphy and Rollins lost to Mysterio and his son Dominik Mysterio, after Murphy accidentally kicked Rollins, costing them the match. On 15 September episode of Raw, Rollins attacked Murphy after Murphy cost Rollins in a steel cage match against Dominik, leading to Murphy getting closer with Rey Mysterio's daughter, Aalyah. As part of the 2020 Draft in October, Murphy was drafted to the SmackDown brand. The storyline continued when after Aalyah kissed Murphy. On 13 November episode of SmackDown, Murphy turned on Rollins, thus turning him face. Murphy defeated Rollins the following week on SmackDown to end the feud. The love storyline between Murphy and Aalyah was dropped shortly after, and Murphy was taken off television. Murphy returned on 5 March 2021 episode of SmackDown, trying to reunite with Seth Rollins against Cesaro to which Rollins rebuffed. Murphy then lost a match against Cesaro. Murphy's last WWE appearance took place on 9 April 2021, WrestleMania Edition of SmackDown in the André the Giant Memorial Battle Royal having been eliminated by King Corbin. On 2 June 2021, Murphy was released from his WWE contract.

Independent circuit (2021–present) 
On 16 October 2021, a video aired during NJPW Strong announcing that Murphy, now going by "Buddy Matthews", would make his New Japan Pro-Wrestling (NJPW) debut at the Battle in the Valley event on 13 November. At the event, he lost to Kazuchika Okada. On 21 January 2022, Matthews wrestled for Major League Wrestling (MLW) at their Blood & Thunder event, losing to TJP.

All Elite Wrestling (2022–present) 
Matthews made his debut for All Elite Wrestling on 23 February 2022 episode of Dynamite aligning himself with Malakai Black and Brody King of the House of Black. After his debut, AEW president Tony Khan made the official announcement of Matthews's signing with the company. At Revolution's buy-in show, the stable won a trios match against Death Triangle (Pac and Penta Oscuro) and Erick Redbeard.

At Revolution on March 5 2023, The House of Black defeated The Elite (Kenny Omega, Matt Jackson, and Nick Jackson) to become the AEW World Trios Championship.

Other media 
Adams as Buddy Murphy made his video game debut as a playable character in WWE 2K16 (as a downloadable character) and also appears in WWE 2K17, WWE 2K20 and WWE 2K22. He appeared on an episode of the reality show Total Divas in January 2018.

Personal life 
Adams was engaged to fellow professional wrestler Alexis Cabrera, better known by the ring name Alexa Bliss. It was reported that the two ended their engagement in September 2018, but still remain friends.

Adams has a background in extreme sports, particularly bungee jumping, rock climbing, and swimming with great whales.
 He is a supporter of his hometown Australian rules football club, the Carlton Football Club; his WWE ring name is a reference to former Carlton midfielder and small forward Marc Murphy.

Adams is in a relationship with fellow Australian wrestler Demi Bennett, known professionally as Rhea Ripley.

Championships and accomplishments 

All Elite Wrestling
AEW World Trios Championship (1 time, current) – with Brody King and Malakai Black
 Ballarat Pro Wrestling
 BPW Australian Championship (1 time)
CBS Sports
Breakthrough Wrestler of the Year (2018)
 Melbourne City Wrestling
 MCW Heavyweight Championship (2 times, current)
 Professional Championship Wrestling
 PCW State Championship (1 time)
 Pro Wrestling Illustrated
 Ranked No. 33 of the top 500 singles wrestlers in the PWI 500 in 2019
WWE
NXT Tag Team Championship (1 time) – with Wesley Blake/Blake
 WWE Cruiserweight Championship (1 time)
 WWE Raw Tag Team Championship (1 time) – with Seth Rollins

References

External links 

 
 
 
 

1988 births
All Elite Wrestling personnel
Australian expatriate sportspeople in the United States
Australian male professional wrestlers
Expatriate professional wrestlers
Living people
NXT Tag Team Champions
NXT/WWE Cruiserweight Champions
Sportsmen from Victoria (Australia)
Sportspeople from Melbourne
21st-century professional wrestlers
The House of Black members